Anncaliia is a genus of aquatic unicellular parasite in the division microsporidium.

References

Microsporidia genera